The Gold of Polubotok is the story of a large amount of gold which Ukrainian Hetman Pavlo Polubotok supposedly deposited into an English bank in 1723, and which would have been returned upon the independence of Ukraine with an astronomical amount of interest.

The Legend

In 1723, Hetman Polubotok was recalled to St. Petersburg by Tsar Peter I of Russia. The story holds that suspecting his imminent arrest, Polubotok secretly deposited 200,000 gold coins (chervonets) in the Bank of England, under 7.5% annual interest. The amount, the bank, and the interest vary in different versions: some sources cite two barrels of gold, or 2.5% annual interest, or the Bank of the British East India Company. In his will, Polubotok allegedly bequeathed eighty percent of the gold to a future independent Ukraine, and the rest to his successors.

Russian investigation and recovery attempts 

The story first became widely known in 1907, when it was published in the Russian journal New Time by Professor Alexander Rubets. In 1908 the Ministry of Foreign Affairs of Russia ordered the issue to be investigated by the Russian Consulate in London. Specifically, their unclaimed deposits at the Bank of England over the previous 200 years were investigated, and were found to total less than the alleged amount of Polubotok's fortune.

In August 1913 a group of 170 individuals was met in Starodub, Chernihiv region who called themselves the offspring of Polubotok. However, none of the offspring were able to documentarily provide the bonafide documents regarding their relationship to Polubotok nor provide any information regarding the account at the Bank of England.

Ukrainian Soviet recovery attempts 

A relative - Ostap Polubotok was however found in São Paulo, Brazil. In 1922 he met up with the Ukrainian Soviet Consul - Yuri Kotsubinsky in Vienna and had with him a copy of the 200-year-old document attesting to his legacy.

Kotsubynsky approached Hryhory Petrovsky with a plan for the recovery of the fortune.

In July 1922 a meeting took place between Ostap Polubotok, Robert Mitchell (from the Bank of England and because of Kotsubynsky's ailment Consul Peter in Maria-Esensdorf outside of Vienna.

The matter however came to a halt with the removal and repression of Petrovsky and Kotsubynsky.

Soviet investigation and recovery attempts

On January 22, 1960 under the Dwight Eisenhower administration the United States proclaimed Ukraine Day. The Soviet KGB reported that England had given money to support this propagandist action and that the money had come from the Polubotok bank account. The matter came to the attention of Nikita Khrushchev who initiated an investigation to recover the money. A commission as set up which included historians - Dr Olena Kompan, and Dr Olena Apanovych.

In January 1968 Olena Apanovych published her findings in a paper read at the Presidium.  She was later asked not to discuss this "state secret".

According to the investigators on 22 May 1723 Polubotok received a summons to appear in Petersburg. Polubotok thought that the matter was related to his son's secret meeting with Pylyp Orlyk in France. Polubotok began his trip to the Russian capital 13 July 1723. It accompanied two huge carts of "salt" and "salted fish". The carts continued to Arkhangelsk and were put onto an English frigate from where the gold was sent to London.

The cargo was met in London by Polobotok's son and Pylyp Orlyk and the gold was deposited into the Bank of England with two copies of Polubotok's instructions in Latin. These two documents remain in the Bank of England today.

In the chaotic time of the Soviet Union's collapse, the story again attracted public attention. In May 1990, Ukrainian poet Volodymyr Tsybulko announced that if the gold were returned, it would amount to 38 kilograms for each citizen of independent Ukraine. This astronomical figure, about twenty times the world's gold reserve, was achieved due to compounding of interest over 270 years. The heated interest in the Polubotok treasury coincided with a visit to Kyiv on June 9, 1990 of British Prime Minister Margaret Thatcher. The Ukrainian parliament ordered the creation of a special committee headed by the Vice Prime Minister of Ukraine, Dr. Petro Tronko, which visited London. The gold, however, has not been found.

Outcomes
The legend of Polubotok's gold was made into a comic film.

References

Sources
 Hetman gold detective, Ihor Malyshevskyi, Zerkalo Nedeli, #50(374), December 22, 2001. (in Russian, in Ukrainian)
 A fool is enriched by a notion, or why Polubotok's will could not have been written, Oleh Havriushyn, Zerkalo Nedeli, #8(383), March 2, 2002. (in Russian, in Ukrainian)
 Once again on chickens with antlers, and on mentality, Ihor Malyshevskyi, Zerkalo Nedeli, #12(387), March 29, 2002. (in Russian, in Ukrainian)
 
 
 

Ukrainian folklore
Economic history of Ukraine